The 1778 English cricket season was the seventh in which matches have been awarded retrospective first-class cricket status. The scorecards of five first-class matches have survived.

Matches
Five first-class match scorecards survive from 1778, four of them involving Hampshire XIs.

29–30 June - England v Hampshire XI - Sevenoaks Vine
6–7 July - Hampshire XI v England - Itchin Stoke Down
10–11 September - Chertsey v England - Laleham Burway
24–25 September - Hampshire XI v Surrey XI - Broadhalfpenny Down
6–8 October - Surrey XI v Hampshire XI - Laleham Burway

Three other matches are known to have been played during the season, including a return match between Chertsey and an England side.

First-class debutants
The following players made their first known appearance during the 1778 season.

 Boltwood 
 Henry Bonham (Hampshire)
 Irons 
 Mansfield
 Mills (Surrey)
 Polden
 Thomas Swayne (Chertsey/Surrey)

References

Further reading
 
 
 
 
 

1778 in English cricket
English cricket seasons in the 18th century